The Indian fringe-fingered lizard (Acanthodactylus cantoris), also known commonly as the Indian fringe-toed lizard, is a species of lizard in the family Lacertidae. The species is endemic to Asia.

Etymology
The specific name, cantoris, is in honor of Danish zoologist Theodore Edward Cantor.

Description
A cantoris has the following characters. Snout acutely pointed. Four supraoculars; subocular not reaching the lip; temporal scales keeled; front edge of the ear usually rather feebly, but distinctly, denticulated. Dorsal scales strongly keeled, very much larger on the hinder part of the back than between the shoulders and on the flanks, rhomboidal, strongly imbricate; 10 to 16 large keeled scales on a transverse line between the hind limbs. Ventral plates usually broader than long, in straight longitudinal and slightly angular transverse series; 12 or 14 plates across the middle of the body. Usually a median series of broad pre-anals, the posterior largest. The hind limb reaches the ear or the eye. 17 to 23 femoral pores on each side. Digital denticulations strong, usually as long as the diameter of the corresponding part of the toe, much more developed on the outer than on the inner edge of the fourth toe. Upper caudal scales strongly keeled; basal subcaudals smooth or obtusely keeled.

Greyish or buff above, with or without small blackish spots; young with whitish longitudinal lines separated by blackish interspaces with series of round whitish spots, which markings gradually become more indistinct; tail pink in the young.

From snout to vent ; tail .

Geographic range
A cantoris is found in eastern Afghanistan, northwestern India (Gujarat, Punjab, Rajasthan, Uttar Pradesh), southwestern Iran, Jordan, and Pakistan.

Type locality: "Ramnuggar".

Habitat
The preferred natural habitat of A. cantoris is sandy areas of desert and shrubland.

Behavior
A terrestrial species, A. cantoris burrows in the sand at the roots of bushes for protection.

Reproduction
A. cantoris is oviparous. Clutch size is two to four eggs, which hatch within three weeks of being laid.

References

Further reading
Das I (2002). A Photographic Guide to Snakes and other Reptiles of India. Sanibel Island, Florida: Ralph Curtis Books. 144 pp. . (Acanthodactylus cantoris, p. 103).
Günther A (1864). The Reptiles of British India. London: The Ray Society. (Taylor & Francis, printers). xxvii + 452 pp. + Plates I-XXVI. (Acanthodactylus cantoris, new species, pp. 73–74).
Salvador A (1982). "A revision of the lizards of the genus Acanthodactylus (Sauria: Lacertidae)". Bonner Zoologische Monographien (16): 1-167. (Acanthodactylus cantoris, pp. 155–159, Figures 106-108, Map 32). (in English, with an abstract in German).
Smith MA (1935). The Fauna of British India, Including Ceylon and Burma. Reptilia and Amphibia. Vol. II.—Sauria. London: Secretary of State for India in Council. (Taylor and Francis, printers). xiii + 440 pp. + Plate I + 2 maps. (Acanthodactylus cantoris cantoris, pp. 371–372).

Acanthodactylus
Reptiles of Afghanistan
Reptiles of Pakistan
Reptiles of India
Reptiles described in 1864
Taxa named by Albert Günther